Dalian Airlines Co Ltd is an airline based at Dalian Zhoushuizi International Airport in  Dalian, Liaoning, China. It is jointly owned by Air China, investing RMB 800 million in cash to hold an 80% stake in the new company, and Dalian Baoshui Zhengtong Co, investing RMB 200 million for the remaining 20%. Dalian Airlines provides both passenger and cargo services. The airline launched operations on 31 December 2011.

History

On 5 July 2011, CAAC, China's civil aviation regulator, granted Air China and Dalian Baoshui Zhengtong Co permission to establish Dalian Airlines Co Ltd. This follows an agreement reached between Air China and the Dalian government in 2010.

The government of Dalian had closed a similar deal with HNA Group, parent of Hainan Airlines, before. However, due to disagreement between the two parties, the deal was abandoned later, opening the door for Air China.

The airline has launched commercial operations effective 31 December 2011;  its first flight was from Dalian to Shenzhen.

Destinations

The airline will serve a domestic network linking its Dalian hub with all Chinese provincial capitals, coastal cities, and tourism destinations. Internationally, Dalian Airlines will operate flights to Japan and South Korea.

Current routes are listed below (as of June 2012):

Fleet
, the Dalian Airlines fleet consists of the following aircraft:

References

Airlines established in 2011
Air China
Airlines of China
Companies based in Dalian
Chinese companies established in 2011